Stefano Bono (born June 18, 1979 in Chiari) is a former Italian professional football player.
He played one game in the Serie A in the 1997/98 season for Brescia Calcio.

External links
 

1979 births
Living people
Italian footballers
Serie A players
Serie B players
Brescia Calcio players
Calcio Lecco 1912 players
Ascoli Calcio 1898 F.C. players
A.C. Ancona players
A.C. Reggiana 1919 players
Pisa S.C. players
Venezia F.C. players
S.S.D. Lucchese 1905 players
Association football midfielders
Vigevano Calcio players